Noah Lucho Harms (born 5 May 1997) is a Aruban-Dutch football player who plays on the Aruba national team.

Club career 
Harms played on the youth of VV Spijkenisse, ADO Den Haag, and Roda JC.

After a break, Harms played on the first squads of ASWH (2019), BVCB (2019-2020), and returned to Spijkenisse (2020-2021). Next, he played at VV Nieuwenhoorn (2021-2022). Since July 2022, he plays for VV Zwaluwen.

International career
Harms made his international debut for Aruba against St. Lucia on 22 March 2019 in a 3-2 defeat against  in the CONCACAF Nations League qualifying rounds, securing their spot to League B. 

On 18 November 2019, Harms scored his first goal for Aruba and his first own goal against Antigua and Barbuda in a 2-3 defeat in the CONCACAF Nations League.

International goals
Scores and results Aruba's goal tally first.

References

1997 births
Living people
Sportspeople from Heerenveen
Aruban footballers
Aruba international footballers
Dutch footballers
Dutch people of Aruban descent
Association football defenders
Footballers from Friesland
ASWH players
VV Spijkenisse players
ADO Den Haag players
Roda JC Kerkrade players
VV Zwaluwen players